James Gould Polk (October 6, 1896 – April 28, 1959) was a prominent U.S. politician of the Democratic Party during the middle of the 20th century.

A native of Highland County, Ohio, Polk grew up on a farm and graduated from high school in New Vienna, Ohio. He did not serve during World War I because of a physical disability, and graduated from Ohio State University in 1919.

Polk worked as a school administrator in small towns in Ohio during the 1920s, and was first elected to office in 1930, as a U.S. Congressman from Ohio's 6th District. He won five elections in a row before stepping down in 1941.

During World War II, Polk worked as a special assistant in the U.S. Department of Agriculture in Washington, D.C.

After the war, Polk re-entered politics, and won back his old Congressional seat in the 1948 election. He remained in Congress until his death.

Polk died of cancer on April 28, 1959, in Washington, D.C. His remains are buried in Highland Cemetery in Highland, Ohio.

See also
 List of United States Congress members who died in office (1950–99)

References

Sources
 Biographical Directory of the United States Congress: POLK, James Gould

1896 births
1959 deaths
People from Highland County, Ohio
Ohio State University alumni
Deaths from cancer in Washington, D.C.
20th-century American politicians
Democratic Party members of the United States House of Representatives from Ohio